Luke Alexander Blackaby (born 1 February 1991) is an English cricketer.  Blackaby is a left-handed batsman who bowls left-arm medium pace.  He was born in Farnborough, Kent and was educated at Wildernesse School.

While studying for his degree in Sports at Durham University, Blackaby made his first-class debut for Durham MCCU against Durham in 2010.  He made four further first-class appearances for the team, the last of which came against Yorkshire in 2011.  In his five first-class matches, he scored 116 runs at an average of 16.57, with a high score of 38.  With the ball, he took a single wicket which came at an overall cost of 133 runs.

A member of MCC, since 2017 Blackaby has worked for Shell Energy in London.

See also
 Marylebone Cricket Club

References

External links
Luke Blackaby at ESPNcricinfo
Luke Blackaby at CricketArchive

1991 births
Living people
People from Farnborough, London
English cricketers
Durham MCCU cricketers
Alumni of Grey College, Durham